The Lutheran Church - International (LC-I) is an American Christian denomination established in 1967 and based in Lyons, New York. Its president from 1967 to 1998 was Pastor E. Edward Tornow of North Dakota. From 1967 to 2011 the LC-I was known as the International Lutheran Fellowship. The LC-I has a mixed episcopal/congregational structure, with four dioceses in North America, including the Northeastern Diocese, the Mid-America Diocese, the Southern Diocese, and the Western Diocese. A Missionary District for Latin and Caribbean ministries is based in Puerto Rico. The LC-I also has ministry outreach in India.  The current president of the LC-I is Robert W. Hotes.

The Lutheran Church-International describes itself as "Confessional", "Orthodox", "Ecumenical (within the understandings based on the Book of Concord)", and "Evangelical". Confessionally, it adheres to the "Gospel of Jesus Christ as faithfully witnessed by the Augsburg Confession of 1530, and the Book of Concord". As an orthodox Christian body, "the LC-I maintains a traditional, faithful understanding of Lutheranism within the church catholic". The Lutheran Church - International teaches that its clergy are ordained in lines of apostolic succession. Further, the LC-I has stated that it will "work with faithful Christians globally", and "internally with those church bodies with whom theological cooperation is possible". Finally, the LC-I sees itself as "a church of the Great Commission", seeking to "make disciples of all nations".

The Lutheran World Parish is a unique ministry within the LC-I. A current LC-I brochure states that the Lutheran World Parish consists of "Individuals desiring to affiliate with the LC-I, but who are not near (a)...congregation".

Established in 2006, the Order of St. Francis-Lutheran (OSF-L) is another ministry of the Lutheran Church-International. The Order is based in St. Catharines, Ontario, Canada and is headed by the Rev. Larry J. Goodnough. Goodnough was commissioned as the OSF-L Superior by Bishop Bougher of the LC-I Northeastern Diocese. The Rev. William Babbitt of Florida serves as U.S. Superior. The OSF-L is a ministry of lay persons and clergy in the spirit of Francis of Assisi, not a religious order.

Synods (from 2011)

2011 – The Mundelein Synod; July 27–30, 2011; University of St. Mary’s of the Lake Conference Center, Mundelein, Illinois 

2012 – The Lyons Synod; (Date, July 2012); First Lutheran Church, Lyons, New York

References

External links

Lutheranism in Canada
Lutheranism in the United States
Lutheranism in North America
Lutheran denominations in North America
Christian organizations established in 1967